The Miami-Dade County Legislative Delegation was created when the state elected officials recognized the importance of their numbers and believed that as a united delegation, speaking with a single voice, they could exercise political influence and visibility far beyond their numbers. The Delegation forms a voting block whose power allows them to influence the creation, direction and enforcement of public policy.

Membership
Today, there are 22 members, 6 Senators and 16 Representatives representing the largest and most populated county in the state of Florida.

The Delegation members have been called upon to work as advocates for varied constituent interests-developing an ever-expanding legislative agenda as well as addressing the concerns of their own particular districts.

Officers
The Executive Director of the Miami-Dade County Legislative Delegation coordinates legislative issues with the Delegation members and their staffs in Tallahassee and Miami-Dade County, the Office of Intergovernmental Affairs, and the Legislature's Committee staff in Tallahassee.

Senator Ana Maria Rodriguez and Representative Kevin Chambliss currently serve as the Chair and Vice Chair of the Delegation, respectively. All Chair and Vice Chair serve one year terms.

The current Executive Director of the Miami-Dade County Delegation is Sandra Saint-Hilaire, MBA. She has been with the Delegation since August 2022.

Function
The Delegation's office primary function is to assist the Legislative Delegation in its daily activities. Those activities range from representing the Delegation members at various community meetings, writing press releases for all legislative achievements/awards of the members, assists citizens in communicating with the members, organizing public hearings and acting as a liaison between the Intergovernmental Affairs Office and the Delegation as needed.

Public hearings
Each year, the Delegation office organizes public hearings which affords the general public, governmental entities and community groups the opportunity to express/request assistance with various projects/issues. The hearings are held in various locations around the County with one normally scheduled for the Commission Chambers. The Delegation formulates its list of legislative priorities from the information obtained at those public hearings. From that list and what the County submits, the Delegation will vote during the first week of the Legislative Session on their list of Critical/Priority Issues.

References

Government of Miami-Dade County, Florida